Kırşehir, formerly Mocissus and Justinianopolis (Ἰουστινιανούπολις), is a city in Turkey. It is the capital district of the Kırşehir Province. According to the 2000 census, the population of the district is 121,947 of which 105,826 live in the city of Kırşehir. The Mayor of Kırşehir is Selehattin Ekicioğlu.

History 

The history of Kırşehir dates back to the Hittites.  During the period of the Hittites, the basin of Kırşehir was known as the country of "Ahiyuva", meaning "the Land of the Achaeans", as the Greeks were known to the Hittites. This basin also took the name Cappadocia at the time of the Romans and Byzantines.

Kırşehir was once known as Aquae Saravenae. The Seljuks took the city in the 1070's and bestowed the current name. In Turkish, "Kır Şehri" means "steppe city" or "prairie city". It became the chief town of a sanjak in the Ottoman vilayet of Angora, which possessed,  1912, 8000 inhabitants, most of them Turks.

In the 19th century, Kırşehir was attached to the sanjak of Ankara. From 1867 until 1922, Kırşehir was part of Angora vilayet. In 1924, Kırşehir was made capital of the new Kırşehir Province. Mustafa Kemal Atatürk visited the city in 1921 and 1931.

Historic buildings and structures

Kesikköprü
Kesikköprü is one of the bridges built by the Seljuk Empire in Central Anatolia.

In the inscription of bridge, it is written that the bridge was built by Atabeg İzzü’d-Din Muhammed in 646 of the Hijrah/1248 of the Christian era during the rule of Keykavus, the son of Keyhüsrev. There is also an old Seljuk mosque built during the reign of either Mesud I or Kilij Arslan II. In the countryside is a ruined tomb of a possible dervish during the times of either Seljuks or Ottomans.

The ones who came from İzmir and tried to reach Sivas and Erzurum from Tokat passed over Kesikköprü. We have learned that the inscription was sunken into the river in 1953. In the 17th and 18th centuries, it took the name of Kesikköprü due to the fact that caravan roads were invaded by the highwaymen.

The three-line instruction destroyed on stone base can hardly be read.

The inscription

"Ressame bi imaret hazihil el kantara el mübareke (fi eyyam han) devlet es sultan el azam İzzü-d dünya ve ‘d Din Ebul Feth Keykavus bin Keyhüsrev Burhan Emirel mü’münin."

"El Mevla el sahibul azam atabek el muazzam nazım mesalih il alem nasır el enam zübdetil eyyam izzeddin ebul meli Muhammed zahir Ali Selçuk ve emiril mü’minil azzellahu nasrahu ve ala kadrehu fi şuhuri sene sitte ve arbain ve sitte mie hamiden lillah ve musallian ala nebiihi Muhammed ve alihi vesellem teslimen kesiran."

Aşık Pasha Mausoleum
Aşık Pasha Mausoleum is the tomb of the 14-century sufi poet Aşık Pasha who died in 1332.

Kırşehir Castle
Kırşehir Castle is located on a hill mound, believed to have been built in the 4th century.
It covers an area of 10 acres. It is thought to have been created by the Byzantine emperor Justinian. Nothing remains from the castle.

Ecclesiastical history

Metropolitan Archbishopric of Mocissus 
Mocissus was also a Christian bishopric, and became a metropolitan see when, as Procopius (De ædif., V, iv) informs us, Justinian divided Cappadocia into three provinces and made this fortified site in north-western Cappadocia metropolis of Cappadocia Tertia, giving it the name of Justinianopolis. Nothing else is known of its history, and its name should perhaps be written Mocessus. There is no doubt that the site of Mocissus, or Mocessus, is that which is occupied by the modern city of Kırşehir. It figured in the Notitiæ episcopatuum until the 12th or 13th century.

Only a few of its bishops are known: the earliest, Peter, attended the Fifth Ecumenical Council (Second Council of Constantinople, 536); the last, whose name is not known, was a Catholic, and was consecrated after the mid-15th century Catholic Council of Florence by Patriarch Metrophanes II of Constantinople.

Titular see 

The diocese was restored in 1895 as a titular archbishopric of the highest (Metropolitan) rank.
It's vacant, having had the following incumbents:
 John Joseph Frederick Otto Zardetti (1895.05.25 – 1902.05.09)
 Giacomo Merizzi (1902.08.21 – 1916.03.22)
 Giovanni Battista Vinati (1916.07.31 – 1917.01.09)
 Adolf Fritzen (1919.07.31 – 1919.09.07)
 Lorenzo Schioppa (1920.08.20 – 1935.04.23)
 John Hugh MacDonald (1936.12.16 – 1938.03.05)
 Nicolas Cadi (1939.11.16 – 1941)
 Roger-Henri-Marie Beaussart (1943.12.10 – 1952.02.29)
 Vigilio Federico Dalla Zuanna, O.F.M. Cap. (1952.11.24 – 1956.03.04)
 Giovanni Jacono (1956.10.02 – 1957.05.26)
 Heinrich Wienken (1957.08.19 – 1961.01.21)
 Gabrijel Bukatko (1961.03.02 – 1964.03.24)

Climate 

Kırşehir has a continental climate (Köppen climate classification: Dsa, Trewartha climate classification: Dc), with cold, snowy winters and hot, dry summers. Light rainfall occurs year-round, except for late summer when rain is virtually absent.

Famous people from Kırşehir 
 Uğur Mumcu, investigative journalist
 Haşim Kılıç, the President of the Constitutional Court of Turkey from October 22, 2007 until February 10, 2015
 Mustafa Bumin the President of the Constitutional Court of Turkey from May 31, 2000 until June 26, 2005
 Lütfi Müfit Özdeş, politician
 Osman Bölükbaşı, politician
 Deniz Bölükbaşı, politician
 Nezaket Ekici, artist
 Muharrem Ertaş, folk musician
 Şemsi Yastıman, folk musician
 Neşet Ertaş, folk poet
 Ahi Evren, preacher - died in Kırşehir
 Caca Bey, politician
 Asik Pasa, preacher, Turkish poet
 Silahdar Seyyid Mehmed Pasha 18th century Ottoman Grand Vizier
 Yasin Öztekin, footballer
 Nuri Şahin, footballer

Gallery

Notes

References 
 
 District governor's official website

External links 
 GigaCatholic with titular incumbent biography links
  
  
 Kirsehir Portal 

 
Roman sites in Turkey
Districts of Kırşehir Province